Besoin (French: Need) is the debut studio album released by Princess Stéphanie of Monaco. The album was released in 1986 through Julisa and Carrere Records. The album was produced by Yves Roze, and released in some countries as Live Your Life or simply Stéphanie. Besoin reached number six at the French Albums Chart and the Swedish Albums Chart, number twelve at the German Albums Chart, and number 59 at the Austrian Albums Chart. It reportedly sold in approximately 1.5 million units, and achieved gold status in France for over 100,000 units.

Album information 
Preceding the release of Besoin, Stéphanie released her début single "Ouragan", which she produced herself. It reportedly sold more than 2 million copies. Stéphanie then signed a recording contract with French record labels Julisa and Carrere. The album was produced by Yves Roze. Besoin was released in September 1986, incorporating dance-pop, synthpop, dance and pop music. Despite the success of her first album, Stéphanie did not make a follow-up for five years until the release of Stéphanie in 1991.

Singles 
 "Ouragan" was released as the lead single from the album. The song achieved a worldwide success, topping the French Singles Chart and charting at number 11 at the Swiss Singles Chart. Its English language version "Irresistible" peaked at number two at the German Singles Chart and number five at the Austrian Singles Chart.
 "Flash" was released in 1986, charting at number four in France and number 28 in Switzerland. Its English language version "One Love to Give" reached number one in Sweden and number ten in Germany.
 "Young Ones Everywhere" was not released as an official single, but to benefit UNICEF.
 "Fleur du mal (à Paul)" was released in 1987, and charted at number 16 in France. The single version has been retitled "Fleurs du mal".
 "Live Your Life" was released in 1987 as the final single from Besoin. It peaked at number nine at the Norwegian Singles Chart.

Track listing

Chart positions

Certifications

References

External links 
 Besoin at the Amazon.com

1986 debut albums
Princess Stéphanie of Monaco albums